"One Day" is a song by the South Korean boy groups 2AM and 2PM, Oneday. It was released on July 4, 2012 as 2AM's third Japanese single and 2PM's fifth Japanese single. The song is the main theme song for the documentary movie "Beyond the Oneday ~Story of 2PM & 2AM~", which was broadcast in Japan starting on June 30.

Release
The single was released in twelve editions: 
Type A is a CD + DVD, 
Type B is the CD single with a front cover artwork of 2PM's member Jun.K, 
Type C is the CD single with a front cover artwork of 2PM's member Nichkhun, 
Type D is the CD single with a front cover artwork of 2PM's member Taecyeon, 
Type E is the CD single with a front cover artwork of 2PM's member Wooyoung, 
Type F is the CD single with a front cover artwork of 2PM's member Junho, 
Type G is the CD single with a front cover artwork of 2PM's member Chansung, 
Type H is the CD single with a front cover artwork of 2AM's member Changmin, 
Type I is the CD single with a front cover artwork of 2AM's member Seulong, 
Type J is the CD single with a front cover artwork of 2AM's member Jo Kwon, 
Type K is the CD single with a front cover artwork of 2AM's member Jinwoon, 
Regular edition is the CD single with a bonus track.

Composition
"One Day" is an original Japanese song, composed by Yu Shimoji, Faya, Super Changddai and Michael Yano. The B-side "No Goodbyes" is an original Japanese song, written and composed by 2PM's MinJun and Emyli. "Angel", CD Only bonus track, is originally a Korean song from 2PM's debut single Hottest Time of the Day.

Track listing

Charts

Oricon

Other Charts

One Day

Release history

References

External links
 Beyond the Oneday ~Story of 2PM & 2AM~ official website
 One Day special website
 Beyond the Oneday ~Story of 2PM & 2AM~ official YouTube Channel
 2PM 2AM Ariola Japan Official Facebook

2012 singles
Dance-pop songs
Japanese-language songs
2PM songs
2012 songs
Ariola Japan singles
Songs written by Michael Yano